Judges who served on the Supreme Court of the Cocos (Keeling) Islands are:
References

Supreme Court of Cocos (Keeling) Islands